Arthur Gomes Lourenço (born 3 July 1998), known as Arthur Gomes or simply Arthur, is a Brazilian footballer who plays as a forward for Portuguese club Sporting.

Club career

Santos
Arthur Gomes was born in Uberlândia, Minas Gerais, and joined Santos' youth setup in November 2012, after representing São Paulo, Uberlândia and Poliesportivo. In January 2015, he signed a two-year professional deal with the former.

In September 2016, after Gabriel's departure to Internazionale, Arthur Gomes was called up to train with the main squad by manager Dorival Júnior. He was first included in a matchday squad on 19 October, for a Copa do Brasil match against Internacional, but remained an unused substitute in the 0–2 away loss and subsequent elimination.

On 6 November 2016 Arthur Gomes made his first team – and Série A – debut, coming on as a late substitute for Jean Mota in a 2–1 away win against Ponte Preta. The following 4 January, after featuring in one further match with the main squad, he renewed his contract until December 2021.

Arthur Gomes scored his first professional goal on 3 February 2017, netting his team's fourth in a 6–2 Campeonato Paulista home routing of Linense. After only appearing rarely with Dorival and Levir Culpi, he was made a starter by interim manager Elano, and scored his first goal in the top tier on 4 November by netting the first in a 3–1 home win against Atlético Mineiro.

Arthur Gomes made his Copa Libertadores debut on 1 March 2018, replacing Jean Mota in a 2–0 away loss against Real Garcilaso.

Chapecoense (loan)
On 1 May 2019, Arthur Gomes was loaned to fellow top tier club Chapecoense until the end of the season.

Atlético Goianiense (loan)
On 23 March 2021, Arthur Gomes was loaned to Atlético Goianiense also in the first division, until the end of the year. After featuring regularly, he left the club on 7 August after accepting an offer from a club from abroad.

Estoril
On 9 August 2021, Arthur Gomes moved abroad after agreeing to a three-year contract with Portuguese Primeira Liga side Estoril; Santos retained 50% of the player's economic rights.

Sporting
On 1 September 2022, Gomes signed a five-year contract with Sporting CP of the same league, for a fee of €2.5 million for half of his economic rights, plus €1.5 million in add-ons. On September 13th, he scored his first UEFA Champions League goal, sealing Sporting's 2-0 victory against Tottenham Hotspur after replacing Marcus Edwards in 90th minute.

Career statistics

References

External links
Santos FC profile 

1998 births
Living people
People from Uberlândia
Brazilian footballers
Association football forwards
Campeonato Brasileiro Série A players
Primeira Liga players
Santos FC players
Associação Chapecoense de Futebol players
Atlético Clube Goianiense players
G.D. Estoril Praia players
Brazilian expatriate sportspeople in Portugal
Expatriate footballers in Portugal
Brazil youth international footballers
Sportspeople from Minas Gerais